Mohammed El-Sayed Abdulmutallab, known by his nickname Jeddo, (born 27 January 1987, in Dukhan) is a Qatari international footballer of Sudanese descent who plays as a winger for Al-Shamal.

International career 
Jeddo was a member of the Qatar squad at the 2011 Asian Cup where he scored in a 3–0 win against Kuwait.

International goals 
Scores and results list Qatar's goal tally first.

References

External links 
 Player Profile at Goalzz.com
 Player Profile at the QSL official website

1987 births
Living people
Qatari footballers
Qatar international footballers
2011 AFC Asian Cup players
Umm Salal SC players
El Jaish SC players
Al-Khor SC players
Al-Shamal SC players
Qatar Stars League players
Qatari people of Sudanese descent
Sudanese emigrants to Qatar
Naturalised citizens of Qatar
Association football forwards
Footballers at the 2010 Asian Games
Asian Games competitors for Qatar